Courts of Washington include:
State courts of Washington

 Washington Supreme Court
 Washington Court of Appeals (3 divisions)
 Washington Superior Courts (39 courts of general jurisdiction, one for each county)
 Washington District Courts (Courts of limited jurisdiction)
 Washington Municipal Courts (Courts of limited jurisdiction)

Federal courts located in Washington
 United States District Court for the Eastern District of Washington
 United States District Court for the Western District of Washington

Former federal courts of Washington
 United States District Court for the District of Washington (extinct, subdivided)

References

External links
 National Center for State Courts – directory of state court websites.

Courts in the United States